Schwarzenfels Castle is a ruined castle in the village of Schwarzenfels in Hesse, Germany.

The castle was damaged and became a ruin in 1648 near the end of the Thirty Years War, but the German State of Hesse has restored portions of the castle and maintained the grounds around the castle. The upper tower is completely restored. The restoration includes a modern spiral staircase, an observation deck, and a flagpole.

Notes and references

Sources and external links

Burgenwelt in German.

Castles in Hesse
Ruined castles in Germany